1979–80 was the sixty-seventh occasion on which the Lancashire Cup completion had been held.
 
Widnes won the trophy  by beating Workington Town by the score of 11-0

The match was played at The Willows, Salford, (historically in the county of Lancashire). The attendance was 6887 and receipts were £7100.00

After relatively little success in the competition, Workington Town had reached the semi-final stage in 1973–74, 1974–75 and 1975–76, had been runner-up in 1976–77, winner in 1977–78, and runners-up in 1978–79 and now again in 1979–80; not a bad eight year record.

Background 

The total number of teams entering the competition remained at last season’s total of 14 with  no junior/amateur clubs taking part.

The same fixture format was retained, but due to the number of participating clubs, this resulted in one  “blank” or “dummy” fixture in the first round, and one bye in the second round.

Competition and results

Round 1 
Involved  7 matches (with one “blank” fixture) and 14 clubs

Round 2 - Quarter-finals 
Involved 3 matches (with one bye) and 7 clubs

Round 3 – Semi-finals  
Involved 2 matches and 4 clubs

Final

Teams and scorers 

Scoring - Try = three points - Goal = two points - Drop goal = one point

The road to success

Notes and comments 
1  * The Willows was the home ground of Salford with a final capacity of 11,363 which included 2,500 seats. The record attendance was 26,470 on the 13 February 1937 in the Challenge Cup first round match  vs Warrington. The final match played on 11 September 2011 at The Willows attracted 10,146 spectators to a Super League match which saw Salford lose 18-44 to Catalans Dragons, a record for a Salford home match in Super League.

See also 
1979–80 Northern Rugby Football League season
Rugby league county cups

References

External links
Saints Heritage Society
1896–97 Northern Rugby Football Union season at wigan.rlfans.com 
Hull&Proud Fixtures & Results 1896/1897
Widnes Vikings - One team, one passion Season In Review - 1896-97
The Northern Union at warringtonwolves.org

RFL Lancashire Cup
Lancashire Cup